The Wairoa North Fault has a maximum 6.7 Mw potential for normal fault rupture and is the closest known active fault to the city of Auckland being  to the south east.

Geology
The Wairoa North Fault is along the western aspect of the Hunua Ranges which is a horst with a mesozoic greywacke basement between it and the inferred inactive Firth of Thames Fault. There are multiple inferred inactive faults in the ranges but the area of the Wairoa North Fault was discovered to be seismologically active with low magnitude earthquakes after recordings began in the 1950s.  The fault has 3 segments with potential for full rupture events every 12,600 years.  To the north the faults now inactive extensions created the Clevedon Valley, and to the south these extensions separates the highest part of the Hunua Ranges from the Happy Valley basin. The fault appears to be along the eastern border of the Stokes Magnetic Anomaly System (New Zealand Junction Magnetic Anomaly) that essentially goes down almost the entire west coast of New Zealand. To the north the Wairoa North Fault continues as the inactive Waikopua Fault which is now projected with high confidence to become the North Waikopua Fault off shore, then the Islington Bay/Mototapu Fault between Rangitoto and Mototapu, before probably continuing as the Whangaparaoa Passage Fault.  To the south the Wairoa North Fault is continued by the inactive Wairoa South and Maunganua faults.

References

Seismic faults of New Zealand